Pyrenacantha malvifolia, common name monkey chair, is a rare species of flowering plants in the genus Pyrenacantha belonging to the family Icacinaceae.

Description
On the top of the caudex emerge some vine-like stems with  green round shaped leaves. These vines in native habitat can reach . Flower are green and quite inconspicuous.

Distribution
This species can be found in central and eastern Africa, in Somalia, Ethiopia, Kenya and Tanzania.

Habitat
This plant grows in the African tropical semi-desert (usually on hill-sides).

References
Zipcodezoo
The International Plant Names Index
Bihrmann

External links
 Image of caudex

malvifolia